William Ralph Nairn (1873/4 – 1960) was an Australian politician. He was the member for Swan in the Western Australian Legislative Assembly from 1914 to 1921, representing the Liberal Party and then the Nationalist Party.

His brother, Walter Nairn, was a member of the Australian House of Representatives and federal Speaker of the House.

References

Year of birth uncertain
1960 deaths
Nationalist Party of Australia members of the Parliament of Western Australia
Members of the Western Australian Legislative Assembly
Place of birth missing
Burials at Karrakatta Cemetery